NKE may refer to:

 Nagkahiusang Kusog sa Estudyante, a political party and mass organization in the University of the Philippines Cebu College
 "No known enemies," forensic and police jargon for a homicide without an obvious perpetrator
 The New York Stock Exchange code for Nike corporation
 Nu Kappa Epsilon, music sorority founded at the College of William and Mary in 1994